Cerro Tenán is located near the village of Ojos de Agua, in the Municipality of Cucuyagua, in the Copán Department of Honduras. Tenán has an altitude of: 1,137 meters or 3,728 feet above sea level.

References

Mountains of Honduras
Copán Department